A side platform (also known as a marginal platform or a single-face platform) is a platform positioned to the side of one or more railway tracks or guideways at a railway station, tram stop, or transitway. A station having dual side platforms, one for each direction of travel, is the basic design used for double-track railway lines (as opposed to, for instance, the island platform where a single platform lies between the tracks). Side platforms may result in a wider overall footprint for the station compared with an island platform where a single width of platform can be shared by riders using either track.

In some stations, the two side platforms are connected by a footbridge running above and over the tracks. While a pair of side platforms is often provided on a dual-track line, a single side platform is usually sufficient for a single-track line.

Layout

Where the station is close to a level crossing (grade crossing) the platforms may either be on the same side of the crossing road or alternatively may be staggered in one of two ways. With the 'near-side platforms' configuration, each platform appears before the intersection and with 'far-side platforms' they are positioned after the intersection.

In some situations a single side platform can be served by multiple vehicles simultaneously with a scissors crossing provided to allow access mid-way along its length.

Larger stations may have two side platforms with several island platforms in between. Some are in a Spanish solution format, with two side platforms and an island platform in between, serving two tracks.

In some situations a single side platform may be in use with the other one (side platform) disused like with Ryde Esplanade.

See also 

Island platform
Split platform

References

Railway platforms

ko:승강장#상대식 승강장
ja:プラットホーム#相対式ホーム